Main Street Historic District is located in Chappell Hill, Washington County, Texas, U.S.A.

The district was added to the United States, National Register of Historic Places on May 15, 1985, under National Register Information System ID: 85001175.  The Texas Historical Commission also has a registration of this site, under atlas number 2085001175.

Photo gallery

See also

Stagecoach Inn of Chappell Hill
National Register of Historic Places listings in Washington County, Texas

References

External links

National Register of Historic Places in Washington County, Texas
Geography of Washington County, Texas
Historic districts on the National Register of Historic Places in Texas